Dillwynia juniperina, commonly known as prickly parrotpea, is a species of flowering plant in the family Fabaceae and is endemic to south-eastern continental Australia. It is an erect, spreading shrub with rigid, linear, sharply-pointed leaves and yellow flowers with red markings.

Description

Taxonomy and naming
Dillwynia juniperina was first formally described in 1825 by Conrad, George and William Loddiges in The Botanical Cabinet. The specific epithet (juniperina) means "juniper-like".

Distribution
This dillwynia grows in scattered locations in drier forest and woodland along the coast, tablelands and western slopes of New South Wales and north-central and eastern Victoria.

References

juniperina
Flora of New South Wales
Flora of Victoria (Australia)
Plants described in 1825